Staroshaygovsky District (Sire Šäjgavoń ajmak; , Tašto Šajgabuje) is an administrative and municipal district (raion), one of the twenty-two in the Republic of Mordovia, Russia. It is located in the northern and central parts of the republic and borders with Nizhny Novgorod Oblast in the north, Lyambirsky District in the east, Ruzayevsky District in the south, Kadoshkinsky District in the southwest, and with Krasnoslobodsky District in the west. Its administrative center is the rural locality (a selo) of Staroye Shaygovo. As of the 2010 Census, the total population of the district was 14,071, with the population of Staroye Shaygovo accounting for 36.9% of that number.

Administrative and municipal status
Within the framework of administrative divisions, Staroshaygovsky District is one of the twenty-two in the republic. The district is divided into seventeen selsoviets which comprise fifty-seven rural localities. As a municipal division, the district is incorporated as Staroshaygovsky Municipal District. Its seventeen selsoviets are incorporated into seventeen rural settlements within the municipal district. The selo of Staroye Shaygovo serves as the administrative center of both the administrative and municipal district.

References

Notes

Sources



 
Districts of Mordovia